Harford National Bank is a historic bank building located at Bel Air, Harford County, Maryland.  It is a one-story, with day-light basement built in a modified Richardson Romanesque style of glazed red brick and rusticated brownstone. It was designed by architect George Archer in 1889.

It was listed on the National Register of Historic Places in 1980.

References

External links
, including photo from 1978, at Maryland Historical Trust

George Archer (architect)
Buildings and structures in Bel Air, Harford County, Maryland
Commercial buildings on the National Register of Historic Places in Maryland
Commercial buildings completed in 1889
Historic American Buildings Survey in Maryland
National Register of Historic Places in Harford County, Maryland